Patrick Vincent Ahern (March 8, 1919 – March 19, 2011) was an American prelate of the Roman Catholic Church. He served as an auxiliary bishop of the Archdiocese of New York from 1970 to 1994.

Biography
Ahern was born in New York City, and attended Manhattan College and Cathedral College in the same city. He began his studies for the priesthood at St. Joseph's Seminary in Yonkers, and also studied at St. Louis University in St. Louis, Missouri, and at the University of Notre Dame in South Bend, Indiana.

Ahern was ordained a priest of the Archdiocese of New York on January 27, 1945. His first assignment was as a curate at St. Helena's Church in The Bronx. He then worked with the Archdiocesan Mission Band until 1955, when he became a curate at St. Patrick's Cathedral. He taught at St. Joseph's Seminary before serving as secretary to Cardinal Francis Spellman from 1958 to 1967. He afterwards became pastor of Our Lady of Angels Church in the Bronx.

On February 3, 1970, Ahern was named an auxiliary bishop for New York and titular Bishop of Naiera by Pope Paul VI. He received his episcopal consecration on the following March 19 from Cardinal Terence Cooke, with Archbishop John Joseph Maguire and Bishop Edwin Broderick serving as co-consecrators, at St. Patrick's Cathedral. As an auxiliary bishop, he continued to serve at Our Lady of Angels Church and was also episcopal vicar for the Bronx. He served as episcopal vicar for Staten Island and pastor of Blessed Sacrament Church from 1980 to 1990. He then became archdiocesan vicar for development.

After reaching the mandatory retirement age of 75, Ahern resigned as an auxiliary bishop on April 26, 1994.

He was widely regarded as one of the foremost experts on the spirituality of Saint Thérèse de Lisieux.

Published works
Maurice and Therese: The Story of Love, Doubleday, 2001.

Awards
2007: Eleanor and Paul Proske Memorial Award for Distinguished Service to the Poor

References

1919 births
2011 deaths
20th-century American Roman Catholic titular bishops
Manhattan College alumni
People of the Roman Catholic Archdiocese of New York